Baby Gabi (Gabriella Szklenár,  Gabi Szklenár ) (born May 26, 1978, Budapest) is a Hungarian pop singer.

She was a member of the girl group Baby Sisters while it was active (1996-2001). She started her solo career as Baby Gabi in 2003.

Solo albums
2003: Van-e helyem? 
2004: Hazudj még nekem! 
2005: Szivárvány 
2007: Duett Album 
2008: Csupa szív
2010: Elmond6om
2012: Lírák

References

1978 births
Living people
21st-century Hungarian women singers
Hungarian pop singers